Lanre Dabiri   (born May 23, 1977), better known by his stage name Eldee, stylized as eLDee, is a retired Nigerian-American rapper, singer, and record producer based in the United States.

He is a  member of the band Trybesmen, which was started in 1998 with rappers KB and Freestyle. He has made five solo albums. In 2019, he said he does not regret quitting music as the path his career was going would not make him have time for his family. On 1 October 2016, Netng longlisted him on its list of 56 greatest Nigerian entertainers of all time, for his contribution towards the music industry, and for founding the first official Nigeria airplay chart, known as Playdata, for monitoring music consumption on radio.

Early life
eLDee was born on 23 may 1977, in Kaduna state a northern geopolitical zone of Nigeria. He is originally from Lagos Island in Lagos State of Nigeria.

Education 
He attended Command Children School kaduna and Essence International School before Moving to Lagos for his higher education. He has a master's degree in Architecture from the University of Lagos, Nigeria in 2001.

Career 
eLDee is credited as one of the pioneers of the afrobeats music genre. In 1998, he started a band called Trybesmen which went on to be one of the music groups that popularized the fusion of hip-hop, highlife, pop and traditional afrobeat music. Trybesmen were a continental hit by the year 2000 and played a pivotal role in the shaping of the new music genre.

eLDee signed a total of 16 artists to his Trybe Records label, and named the collaboration of all said artists Da Trybe. They produced the singles "Work it out" and "Oya" in 2002, and the album BIG Picture in 2005.

After moving to the United States in 2002, eLDee recorded a solo album titled Long Time Coming (2004). He followed it up with Return of the King (2006), which contains the single "I Go Yarn". Return of the King won "Best International Album" at the 2007 Nigeria Entertainment Awards in New York City. His subsequent albums are Big Boy (2008), originally titled Evolution, Is it your money Vol.1 (2010) and Undeniable (2012).

eLDee has worked as an artist, producer, director and an interactive media consultant.

Personal life
"Lanre" is a derivative for the Yoruba name "Olanrewaju" (which translates to "Wealth is moving forward").

eLDee and his long-term partner, Dolapo Latinwo-Bello married and together they have 2 daughters, Temi, and Toke. He has been based in Atlanta, USA since 2002.

In December 2013 he posted a message on his official Twitter page to voice his support for gay rights, saying that hopefully one day soon Africa will realize that anti-gay sentiment is no different from racial or religious discrimination.

Discography

Albums
2004: Long Time Coming
2006: Return of the King
2008: Big Boy
2010: Is It Your Money
2012: Undeniable

Compilations
2000: L.A.G Style by Trybesmen
2004: The Big Picture (Trybe Records Album)
2009: The Champion: The Hits

See also
 African hip hop
 Nigerian hip hop
 Music of Nigeria

References

External links
 Official Website
 Interview with Eldee
 Listen to a clip of a Trybesmen single from the BBC Website

1977 births
Nigerian male musicians
Nigerian songwriters
Nigerian male rappers
American people of Yoruba descent
Yoruba architects
Yoruba musicians
Nigerian hip hop singers
Living people
University of Lagos alumni
People from Kaduna
Rappers from Lagos
Nigerian emigrants to the United States
The Headies winners
Nigerian music industry executives
English-language singers from Nigeria
Yoruba-language singers
20th-century Nigerian musicians
21st-century Nigerian musicians
Nigerian hip hop record producers
21st-century Nigerian architects
20th-century male musicians
21st-century male musicians